Wild Willy's is a New England-based hamburger restaurant first opened in York, Maine. in 2001. It was founded by Jim Williams.

References

External links
 

Restaurants established in 2001
Fast-food hamburger restaurants
Fast-food chains of the United States
Fast-food franchises
Restaurants in Maine
2001 establishments in Maine
York, Maine